Voltron: The End is a 2011 fan film written and directed by Alex Albrecht and starring Timothy Omundson. The 4-minute short film was uploaded on YouTube on October 9, 2011.

Plot
Lance wakes up after a massive battle in a now disabled Red Lion, only to discover that this may be the end of Voltron. He must decide whether to live a few more minutes or try to tell the world what happened. The end is only the beginning.

Cast
 Timothy Omundson as Lance
 Heather Stewart as Red Lion computer (voice)

References

External links
 

2010s science fiction films
Voltron
2011 short films
2011 films
Fan films
2010s English-language films